Martti Juhani Suosalo (born 19 July 1962) is a Finnish actor and singer.
 
Suosalo was born in Oulu, and began his career in 1986 with an appearance in a TV series. He began to work as a regular actor on Finnish television but also appeared in several films in the early 1990s such as the 1994 film Aapo alongside actors such as Taisto Reimaluoto, Ulla Koivuranta and Kai Lehtinen.

While most of his work has been in television in 1999 Suosalo appeared in just about every major film produced in Finland that year appearing on the big screen in films such as Rentun Ruusu, Sibelius and Lapin kullan kimallus.

In 2006, Suosalo has appeared in the TV series Ilonen talo and in the movie Kalteva torni, which stars another Suosalo family member, his 7-year-old daughter Siiri Suosalo, in her first major movie role.

Suosalo voiced the Finnish janitor Ahti in the 2019 video game Control by Remedy Entertainment, for which he won the British Academy Games Award for Performer in a Supporting Role.

At the 2020 Vienna Independent Film Festival Martti Suosalo received the Best Actor award for his role in Laugh or Die.

Partial filmography 
 The Winter War (Talvisota, 1989)
 Hobitit (1993)
 The Last Wedding (1995)
 The Swan and the Wanderer (Kulkuri ja joutsen, 1999)
 Gold Fever in Lapland (Lapin kullan kimallus, 1999)
 The Rose of the Rascal (Rentun ruusu, 2001)
 The Classic (Klassikko, 2001)
 Sibelius (2003)
 The Leaning Tower (Kalteva torni, 2006)
 Black Ice (Musta jää, 2007)
 Ricky Rapper (Risto Räppääjä, 2008)
 Last Cowboy Standing (Skavabölen pojat, 2009)
 Ricky Rapper and the Bicycle Thief (Risto Räppääjä ja polkupyörävaras, 2009)
 Ja saapuu oikea yö (2012)
 Control (2019, video game)

References

External links

1962 births
Living people
Actors from Oulu
BAFTA winners (people)
Finnish male actors
Finnish male television actors
20th-century Finnish male singers